Cinex (Circuito Nacional de Exhibidores, S.A.) is Venezuela's largest cinema chain,  with 27 locations in 12 Venezuelan cities. It was founded in 1998 through the merger of three companies (Circuito Radonski, Venefilms and Grupo Blanco).

References

External links
 Cinex Facebook page
 Cinex Twitter page
 Cinex YouTube page
 Cinex Instagram page
 Cinex Snapchat page

Mass media companies of Venezuela
Cinemas and movie theaters chains
Entertainment companies established in 1998
Venezuelan companies established in 1998
Venezuelan brands